When indicating List of government schools in Sri Lanka it can be individually indicated as lists of government schools in Western, Southern, Eastern, Northern, North Central, Central, North Western, Sabaragamuwa and Uva  provinces.

Western Province 

This province consists of Colombo, Gampaha and Kalutara districts and the total number of schools is 1366.

Colombo District
See this for the total list of government schools in Colombo District which consists of 413 schools.

Gampaha District
See this for the total list of government schools in Gampaha District which consists of 539 schools.

Kalutara District
See this for the total list of government schools in Kalutara District which consists of 414 schools.

 Government